Radecki may refer to:

Adam Radecki (born 1994), Polish footballer
Barbara Radecki, Canadian actress
John Radecki (1865–1955), Australian stained-glass artist
Mateusz Radecki (born 1993), Polish footballer
Thomas Radecki (born 1946), former American psychiatrist
Jan Mikulicz-Radecki (1850–1905), Polish-Austrian surgeon
 Tracey Anne Radecki, Sydney Australia
Social Welfare Worker at swsahs.nsw.gov

Polish-language surnames